Orbital tuning refers to the process of adjusting the time scale of a geologic or climate record so that the observed fluctuations correspond to the Milankovitch cycles in the Earth's orbital motion. Because changes in the Earth's orbit affect the amount and distribution of sunlight the Earth receives, such changes are expected to introduce periodic climate changes on time scales of 20-100 kyr. Long records of sedimentation or climate should record such variations; however, such records often have poorly constrained age scales. As a result, scientists will sometimes adjust the timing of the features in their records to match the predictions of orbital theory in the hopes of improving the dating accuracy. However, "overtuning" can result in apparent features that have no basis in the real data, such as occurred with the original SPECMAP record.

References 

Dating methods
Paleoclimatology